Patricia Mell "Patti" Blagojevich (born April 9, 1965), née Mell, is the former First Lady of Illinois and wife of Rod Blagojevich, the former Governor of Illinois, who was impeached and removed from office.  She served as First Lady of Illinois from January 2003 to January 2009.  Patricia Blagojevich was also a contestant on the NBC reality show I'm a Celebrity…Get Me out of Here in June 2009. She placed 4th in the competition.

Personal life 
Blagojevich was born Patricia Mell, the daughter of former Chicago alderman Richard Mell. She earned her bachelor's degree in economics from the University of Illinois at Urbana–Champaign. Her sister Deb Mell served in the Illinois State House of Representatives from 2009 to 2013, and on the Chicago City Council from 2013 to 2019. She is friends with ex-professional basketball player John Salley.

First Lady 
As First Lady of Illinois, Blagojevich supported the illiteracy eradication initiatives and the Illinois Pediatric Vision Initiative.

In 2009 she was fired from a $100,000-a-year fundraising job after controversy regarding alleged taped statements. Blagojevich was also subpoenaed in February 2009 for documents related to her husband's political campaign and her work as a real estate agent.

I'm a Celebrity...Get Me out of Here! 

In 2009, after her husband was removed as Governor of Illinois, Blagojevich appeared as a contestant on NBC reality show, I'm a Celebrity…Get Me out of Here. She placed fourth on the show.

References 

1965 births
Living people
First Ladies and Gentlemen of Illinois
Illinois Democrats
University of Illinois Urbana-Champaign alumni
People from Chicago
American real estate brokers
Participants in American reality television series
Rod Blagojevich